The Hazaraspids (1115–1424) were a Kurdish dynasty that ruled the Zagros Mountains region of southwestern Iran, essentially in Lorestan and which flourished in the later Saljuq, Ilkhanid, Muzaffarid, and Timurid periods.

Etymology 
Although the founder was Abu Tahir ibn Muhammad, the dynasty is named after the latter's son and successor, Malik Hazarasp. The name of the dynasty is of Iranian origin, and means "thousand horses".

History 
The founder of dynasty was Abu Tahir ibn Muhammad, a descendant of the Shabankara chieftain Fadluya, who was initially a commander of the Salghurids of Fars and was appointed as the governor of Kuhgiluya, but eventually gained independence in Luristan and extended his realm as far as Isfahan and assumed the prestigious title of atabeg. His son, Malik Hazarasp fought a successful campaign against Salghurids and assisted Jalal-al-din Khwarezmshah in his struggle against the Mongols. Another Hazaraspid ruler Takla, accompanied Hulagu on his march to Baghdad, but deserted because of the murder of the last caliph. He was eventually caught and executed on Hulagu's order.

Yusuf Shah I received Ilkhan Abaqa's confirmation of his rule and added Khuzestan, Kuhgiluya, Firuzan (near Isfahan) and Golpayegan to his domain. Afrasiab I attempted to extend his control to the coast of Persian Gulf but faced stiff opposition from the Mongols who defeated his army at Kuhrud near Kashan. He was reinstated by Ilkhan Gaykhatu but was executed by Gazan in October 1296.

The capital of Hazaraspids was located at Idaj located in present-day northern Khuzestan. Yusuf Shah II annexed the cities of Shushtar, Hoveizeh and Basra in the first half of fourteenth century. During the reign of Shams-al-din Pashang, the dynasty faced attacks from the Muzaffarids and the capital Idaj temporarily fell into their hands, until the occupiers had to retreat due to their own internecine fighting.

In 1424, the Timurid ruler Shahrukh Mirza overthrew the last Hazaraspid ruler Ghiyath al-Din thereby ended the dynasty. Maintaining their rule throughout the Seljuk, Mongol and somewhat into the Timurid era, the Hazaraspids played a part in the preservation of the Persian identity during foreign rule.

Rulers
Abu Tahir ibn Muhammad (r. 1115–1153)
Yusuf Shah I (r.1153-1023)
Malik Hazarasp (r. 1204–1248)
Imad al-Din ibn Hazarasp (r. 1248–1251)
Nusrat al-Din (r. 1252–1257)
Takla (r. 1257–1259)
Shams al-Din Alp Arghun (r. 1259-1274)
Yusuf Shah I (r. 1274–1288)
Afrasiab I (r. 1288–1296)
Nusrat al-Din Ahmad (r. 1296–1330)
Rukn al-Din Yusuf Shah II (r. 1330–1340)
Muzaffar al-Din Afrasiab II (r. 1340–1355)
Shams al-Din Pashang (r. 1355–1378)
Malik Pir Ahmad (r. 1378–1408)
Abu Sa'id (r. 1408–1417)
Shah Husayn (r. 1417–1424)
Ghiyath al-Din (r. 1424)

See also
List of Kurdish dynasties and countries
Khorshidi dynasty

References

Sources

Further reading
 

Kurdish dynasties
Atabegs
12th century in Iran
13th century in Iran
14th century in Iran
History of the Kurdish people
History of Kurdistan
History of Lorestan Province
History of Fars Province
History of Kohgiluyeh and Boyer-Ahmad Province
History of Chaharmahal and Bakhtiari Province
15th century in Iran